Dunboyne A.F.C. is an Irish association football club from Dunboyne, Co. Meath. It was one of the first soccer clubs established in the county of Meath, and was founded in 1970. One of the club's values is to promote the game of soccer in its community, in a hurling/gaelic football dominated country. Dunboyne A.F.C. was recognized with the UEFA Grassroots Bronze Medal for best grassroots club in 2010, and won the AVIVA Club of the Year award in 2009, with representatives from the club meeting with Brazilian football legend, Pele.

References 
 

Association football clubs in County Meath
1970 establishments in Ireland
Leinster Senior League (association football) clubs